The Republic of Namibia has an honours system comprising orders, medals, military decorations, and police decorations.  Legislation also provides for the establishment of decorations and medals for the intelligence service, the prisons service, and the fire services.

These honours and awards superseded those used by the then territory of South West Africa before independence in 1990.

Orders

The following orders are conferred by the President of Namibia:

 Order of the Most Ancient Welwitschia mirabilis  (1995- ) — for the President and other heads of state.
 Most Brilliant Order of the Sun (1995 -) — for meritorious service.
 Most Excellent Order of the Eagle (1995 -) — for diplomatic services.
 Order of the Mukorob (1995 -) — for meritorious military service.
 Most Distinguished Order of Namibia (1995 -) — for meritorious service.

Medals

  Independence Medal (1995) — to commemorate the independence of Namibia in 1990.
  Liberation Medal (1995) — for services connected with the liberation of Namibia from South African administration.

Namibian Defence Force

The Namibian Defence Force has the following decorations and medals:

  Namibian Cross for Bravery: Gold
  Namibian Cross for Bravery: Silver
 Namibian Cross for Bravery: Bronze
---
  Campaign Medal — for service in military operations, e.g. in East Timor and Sierra Leone.
  Medal of Honour — presented to the next-of-kin of NDF personnel who are killed on service.
  Commendation Medal — Awarded to NDF officers of ranks of Colonel and above, recognition of exceptional service, loyalty and diligence.
  Operation Mandume campaign Medal— Awarded to NDF Personnel that participated in anti UNITA cross border operations.
---
 Service Medal: Gold — for 30 years service in the NDF.
 Service Medal: Silver — for 20 years service in the NDF.
 Service Medal: Bronze — for 10 years service in the NDF.
---
 Namibian Champion Shot Medal — for the winners of the annual shooting championships. This is the equivalent of the Queen's Medal for Champion Shots in the United Kingdom, the Commandant General's Medal, and the SADF Champion Shot Medal in South Africa.

Namibian Army

The Namibian Army has the following decorations and medals:
  Army Pioneer Medal— Awarded  to Army personnel that were the pioneers of the Army in 1990
  Army 10 years service Medal
  Army 20 years service Medal
 Army Commendation Medal

Namibian Navy

The Namibian Navy has the following decorations and medals:
 Navy Pioneer Medal
 Southern Cross Medal
 Navy Cross Medal
 Gold Star Medal
 Sacharia Medal
 Achievement Medal 
 Ten Year Service
 750 Days at Sea Service Medal
 250 Days at Sea Service Medal

Namibian Air Force

The Namibian Air Force has the following decorations and medals:
 Air Force Pioneer Medal
 Air Force 10 years service Medal
 Air Force 20 years service Medal
  Air Force Commander's Exemplary Medal
  Air Cadre Medal
  Air Force Longevity Medal

Namibian Police Force

The Namibian Police Force has the following decorations and medals

 NP Cross of Honour (CH) (2003- ) — for a very exceptional death-defying act of conspicuous bravery.
 NP Cross for Bravery (CB) (2003- ) — for an act of bravery in great danger.
 Decoration for Outstanding Meritorious Svce of the Highest Order (OMS) (2003- ) — for outstanding meritorious service of the highest order (officers only).
 Decoration for Outstanding Meritorious Service and Utmost Devotion to Duty (DSD) (2003- ) — for outstanding meritorious service and utmost devotion to duty (other ranks only).
 Commendation Medal (2003- ) — for special service of a high order.
---
 Campaign Medal (2003- ) — for service in operations.
 Medal of Honour (2003- ) — presented to the next-of-kin of NPF personnel who are killed in the execution of their duties.
 Wound Medal (2003- ) — for being severely wounded in the execution of duty.
---
 NP Service Medal: Gold (2003- ) — for 30 years service in the NPF.
 NP Service Medal: Silver (2003- ) — for 20 years service in the NPF.
 NP Service Medal: Bronze (2003- ) — for 10 years service in the NPF.
 Reservist Medal (2003- ) — for 5 years service as a police reservist.
 Honourable Discharge Medal (2003- ) — awarded on honourable discharge from the NPF.
---
 President's Shottist Medal (2003- ) — for the winners of the annual shooting championships.

References

External links

 South African Medals Website

Namibia and the Commonwealth of Nations